The Rt Rev. Avgustyn Ivanovych Monsignor Voloshyn  (17 March 1874 – 19 July 1945), also known as Augustin Voloshyn, was a Carpatho-Ukrainian politician, teacher, essayist, and Greek Catholic 
priest of the Mukacheve eparchy in Czechoslovakia.
 
He was president of independent Carpatho-Ukraine during its single day's existence (15 March 1939).

Life
Voloshyn was born 17 March 1874 in Kelecsény, Carpathian Ruthenia, Máramaros County, Austria-Hungary (now Kelechyn, Ukraine). He studied at the Ungvár (now Uzhhorod, Ukraine) School of Theology and at Budapest University. He became a Greek Catholic priest and in 1924 was appointed a papal chamberlain (thus gaining the title of Monsignor). From 1900 to 1917 he was a professor of mathematics at Uzhhorod Teacher Institute. 

In 1918 he became head of the Subcarpathian National Council, which in 1919 asked Czechoslovakia to confederate Carpathian Ruthenia into Czechoslovakia; this came about in autumn 1919. In 1925 he was elected an MP to Parliament in Prague, as leader of the Ruthenian National Christian Party.

On 26 October 1938 Czechoslovak President Hácha named Voloshyn head of the government of the Subcarpathian Autonomous Region. Following the breakup of Czechoslovakia in March 1939, Voloshyn tried to proclaim Carpatho-Ukraine's independence and, with the help of local units of the Czechoslovak Army, on 15 March 1939 for a few hours became president of Carpatho-Ukraine. He proposed, to the Kingdom of Romania, Carpatho-Ukraine's unification with Romania, but the proposal was rejected and one day later the region was occupied by, and annexed to, Hungary. On 19 March 1939 Voloshyn, under the protection of the last Czechoslovak troops, retreated to the border of Romania, an ally of Czechoslovakia. Voloshyn then fled to Prague, where he lived during the war and was a professor at the Ukrainian Free University. 

In October and November 1944 the Soviet Red Army captured Carpathian Ruthenia, which was incorporated into the Ukrainian SSR. (The government of Czechoslovakia subsequently, on 29 June 1945, agreed to the territory's cession.) The population of Carpathian Ruthenia thus became Soviet citizens. 

When the Soviet army took Prague in May 1945, Voloshyn was arrested by the NKVD and taken to Moscow. Though he had never been a Soviet citizen, he was accused of being a "Ukrainian nationalist and hostile to the Soviet Union." He died 19 July 1945 in Moscow's Butyrka prison; the official cause of death was given as heart failure. Voloshyn's burial place is unknown.

In 2002, by decree of then Ukrainian president Leonid Kuchma, Voloshyn was recognized as a Hero of Ukraine, with   the civilian decoration of the Order of the State.

See also 
 Military history of Carpathian Ruthenia during World War II
 First Vienna Award
 Second Vienna Award
 Carpatho-Ukraine

References

Further reading 
 Tomeš, Josef. Biografický slovník Vol. III.

External links
 Avhustyn Voloshyn at the Encyclopedia of Ukraine
 Deportation of Voloshyn (in Czech)

 

1874 births
1945 deaths
People from Zakarpattia Oblast
People from the Kingdom of Hungary
Ruthenian Peasants Party politicians
Members of the Chamber of Deputies of Czechoslovakia (1925–1929)
Ukrainian politicians before 1991
Ukrainian people of World War II
Recipients of the title of Hero of Ukraine
Ukrainian people who died in Soviet detention
Carpatho-Ukraine
Ukrainian independence activists
Heads of state of former countries